Khondab (also Romanized as Khondāb, Khandāb, and Khendāb; also known as Kandu) is a village in Dodangeh-ye Olya Rural District, Ziaabad District, Takestan County, Qazvin Province, Iran. At the 2006 census, its population was 123, in 34 families.

References 

Populated places in Takestan County